Bella is a weekly magazine aimed at women, currently published in the United Kingdom by H Bauer Publishing, the UK subsidiary of the German-owned family business, the Bauer Media Group.

History and profile
Bella was started in 1987. The first issue was published on 5 October 1987. It was the first magazine published in the UK by Bauer and continues to be one of the strongest selling women's magazines in the country overall. A new issue is published every Tuesday. The headquarters of the magazine is in London.

For the first half of 2013 Bella had a circulation of 209,022 copies.

References

External links

1987 establishments in the United Kingdom
Bauer Group (UK)
Weekly magazines published in the United Kingdom
Women's magazines published in the United Kingdom
Magazines published in London
Magazines established in 1987
Celebrity magazines published in the United Kingdom